New Haven Legal Assistance Association, Inc. (LAA) is a nonprofit organization incorporated with funding from the Ford Foundation on April 7, 1964 to "secure justice for and to protect the rights of those residents of New Haven County unable to engage legal counsel." LAA provides free legal services in the fields of child and family law, benefits, employment, health, elder, disabilities, consumer, housing, and civil rights to eligible individuals and families in the greater New Haven area. It maintains partnerships with Yale and Quinnipiac Law Schools.

History
In 1964, the year of the LAA’s founding, the American Bar Foundation estimated that some 1,400,000 indigents were tried each year without lawyers in the United States. Seeking a remedy, the government and private charitable organizations began to finance “neighborhood law offices” to accommodate the vast number of individuals requiring legal assistance.

The LAA, financed by the Ford Foundation in 1964, was one of the first legal services programs to be established. On May 1, 1964, it opened its first office. At the ceremony, Supreme Court Justice Arthur Goldberg lauded the opening as “the start of a new process – a process which will expand the rule of law to all segments of the population.” In 1965, when the federal government began funding legal services through the Office of Economic Opportunity, LAA was used as a model for more than 300 programs that were opened around the country.

Throughout the 1960s, the LAA continued to expand in an effort to meet the overwhelming demand for its services. LAA added attorneys (reaching a high of 30 lawyers) and opened additional neighborhood offices (for a total of seven). However, in the early 1970s, large government funding cuts forced the LAA to reduce its staff and number of neighborhood offices. Cuts continued in the early 1980s under the Reagan administration.

The mission of New Haven Legal Assistance Association, Inc. is to provide high-quality legal services to individuals and groups unable to obtain legal services because of limited income, age, disability, discrimination and other barriers.

In 1983, the LAA moved into its current offices at Court and State Streets in New Haven.

Notable court cases
1967
 Alvarado v. Dunn
 State v. Hudson
1969
 Solman v. Shapiro
1971
 Boddie v. Connecticut : In 1971, the LAA argued the case of Boddie v. Connecticut before the United States Supreme Court.
 Gonzalez v. Harder
 Wallace v. Johnson
 Campagnuolo v. Harder
 Rivera v. Dunn
1972
 Lynch v. Household Finance Corporation
 Marotti v. White
 Barber v. White
 Porta v. White
 Givens v. W.T. Grant Co.
 O’Brien v. Trevethen
1973
 In re Kokoszka
 Connecticut Union of Welfare Employees, et al. v. White
1974
 Ives v. W.T. Grant Co.
 Burrell v. Norton
1975
 New Haven Tenants Representative Council v. New Haven Housing Authority
 U.S. v. Dixwell Housing Corporation
1976
 Foskey v. Hills
 Morales v. Hills
 Sanchez v. Maher
 Sockwell v. Maloney
1978
 Davis v. Village Park II Realty Co.
1980
 Morales v. Lukas
 Martinez v. Maher
1981
 City of New Haven v. Gonzalez
 Rudd v. Holiday of Bridgeport, Inc.
 Connelly v. New Haven Housing Authority
1982
 Community Labor Alliance v. Employment Security Board of Review
 R.M. v. New Haven Board of Education
1983
 Jones v. Maher
 Nelson v. Regan
 McNamara v. Peraro
 Mutts v. Dale Funding Corp.
1984
 Hoskie v. New Haven Housing Authority
 Dukes v. Durante
1986
 Staffier v. Kastens
 Grant v. Harris
1987
 White v. Heintz
 Nelson v. Heintz
 Jones v. Heintz
1988
 Stevenson v. Ansonia Housing Authority
 Hoyeson v. Prete
 Brookshire v. J-Mac Realty
 Dow v. Green
1989
 Harrison v. Town of Old Saybrook
 Hilton v. City of New Haven
 Beasley v. Harris
 Welfare v. Ginsberg
1990
 Connelly v. Housing Authority of the City of New Haven
1992
 In re Baby Girl B.
 Mercado v. Commissioner of Income Maintenance
1995
 Hilton v. City of New Haven
 Christian Community Action v. Cisneros
 Ward v. Thomas
 Nelson v. Commissioner, Department of Social Services
 State v. Colton
1996
 Grillo v. Thomas
 Bristol Savings Bank v. Savinelli, et al.
 Dime Savings Bank v. Buber
 State v. Person
1997
 Kostok v. Giardi
 Ladd v. Thomas
1998
 NAACP, et al. v. Milford Housing Authority, et al.
 Frank v. Thomas
1999
 Desario v. Thomas
2001
 Hargrove v. Town of North Haven
2003
 Tappin v. Homecomings Financial Network, Inc.
 Pragano v. Wilson-Coker
 Rabin v. Wilson-Coker
 Edgewood Village Association v. Housing Authority of the City of New Haven
 Karen L. v. Health Net of the Northeast, Inc., et al.
2004
 State v. Peeler
2006
 State v. Soldi
 Health Net of Connecticut v. Freedom of Information Commission
2007
 Raymond v, Rowland, et al.
 McKesson Health Solutions v. Starkowski
2008
 Housing Authority of the City of New Haven v. Goodwin
2009
 State v. Connor
 State v. Terwilliger
 State v. Calabrese
 Urena v. DeBenedetto
2011
 State v. Bryan
 In Re Lukas K
 Valley Housing, et al. v. City of Derby
 Dixon v. Zabka
 Wilkins v. Housing Authority of the City of New Haven

References

External links
 New Haven Legal Assistance Association
 CTLawHelp.org

Legal aid in the United States